FC Spartak Semey is a Kazakh football club based in Semey. A leading club in the early years of the Kazakhstan Premier League, and under the name Yelimay Semipalatinsk (or simply "Yelimay") they were three-time champions of Kazakhstan in 1994, 1995 and 1998. However, they are currently in First Division.

History
Yelimay most recently won the Kazakh league while the Football Federation of Kazakhstan were AFC affiliates. After Kazakhstan switched to UEFA affiliation, Yelimay were relegated to the second-tier Kazakhstan First Division.

After the annex of former Semey Province to East Kazakhstan Province, the city of Semey was no longer a province capital. Thus all financial support from province went to FC Vostok, from Oskemen, the current province capital.

Names
1964 : Founded as Tsementnik
1971 : Renamed  Spartak
1993 : Renamed  Yelimay
1999 : Renamed  AES Yelimay for sponsorship reasons
2001 : Renamed  Yelimay
2004 : Renamed  Semey
2008 : Renamed  Spartak

Domestic history

Continental history

1 Yelimay Semipalatinsk withdrew after the 1st leg.

Honours
Kazakhstan Premier League (3):1994, 1995, 1998
Kazakhstan Cup (1): 1995

Notes

External links
Official website

 
Semey, FC
1964 establishments in the Kazakh Soviet Socialist Republic
Association football clubs established in 1964
Semey